Rome Against Rome is a 1964 Italian peplum film directed by Giuseppe Vari.

Cast
 John Drew Barrymore as Aderbad
 Susy Andersen as Tullio
 Ettore Manni as Gaius
 Ida Galli as Rhama
 Mino Doro as Lutetius
 Ivano Staccioli as Sirion
 Philippe Hersent as Azer
 Andrea Checchi

Production
Director Vari filmed at CSC Studios. Rome Against Rome was the second last film by the production company Galatea studio and the film historian Tim Lucas described as representing the end of the peplum cycle as it was a "victim of the burgeoning "Spaghetti Western" movement".

Release
Rome Against Rome was distributed theatrically in Italy by Cineriz on February 13, 1964.  Lucas noted that the original English export print titled Rome Against Rome was dubbed under the direction of Tony Russel and that its soundtrack was "a chaotic mess". The film was cut for foreign release with its original 110 minute running cut to 97 minutes for its British release as Rome Against Rome and cut further on its American release for American International Pictures as War of the Zombies.

Reception
In his book Italian Horror Film Directors, Louis Paul described the film as " a visually arresting and colorful but minor contribution to both the horror film genre and the heroic adventure sagas from which its origins sprung."

References

Footnotes

Sources

External links
 

1964 films
1960s fantasy films
Italian fantasy films
Peplum films
Films directed by Giuseppe Vari
Films set in the Roman Empire
Italian zombie films
Sword and sandal films
1960s Italian-language films
1960s Italian films